"American Pie" is a song by American singer and songwriter Don McLean. Recorded and released in 1971 on the album of the same name, the single was the number-one US hit for four weeks in 1972 starting January 15 after just eight weeks on the US Billboard charts (where it entered at number 69). The song also topped the charts in Australia, Canada, and New Zealand. In the UK, the single reached number 2, where it stayed for three weeks on its original 1971 release, and a reissue in 1991 reached No. 12. The song was listed as the No. 5 song on the RIAA project Songs of the Century. A truncated version of the song was covered by Madonna in 2000 and reached No. 1 in at least 15 countries, including the United Kingdom, Canada, and Australia. At 8 minutes and 42 seconds, McLean's combined version is the sixth longest song to enter the Billboard Hot 100 (at the time of release it was the longest). The song also held the record for almost 50 years for being the longest song to reach number one before Taylor Swift's "All Too Well (10 Minute Version)" broke the record in 2021. Due to its exceptional length, it was initially released as a two-sided 7-inch single. "American Pie" has been described as "one of the most successful and debated songs of the 20th century".

The repeated phrase "the day the music died" refers to a plane crash in 1959 that killed early rock and roll stars Buddy Holly, The Big Bopper, and Ritchie Valens, ending the era of early rock and roll; this became the popular nickname for that crash. The theme of the song goes beyond mourning McLean's childhood music heroes, reflecting the deep cultural changes and profound disillusion and loss of innocence of his generation – the early rock and roll generation – that took place between the 1959 plane crash and either late 1969 or late 1970. The meaning of the other lyrics, which cryptically allude to many of the jarring events and social changes experienced during that period, have been debated for decades. McLean repeatedly declined to explain the symbolism behind the many characters and events mentioned; he eventually released his songwriting notes to accompany the original manuscript when it was sold in 2015, explaining many of these, and further elaborated on the lyrical meaning in a 2022 interview/documentary celebrating the song's 50th anniversary, in which he stated the song was driven by impressionism and debunked some of the more widely speculated symbols.

In 2017, McLean's original recording was selected for preservation in the National Recording Registry by the Library of Congress as being "culturally, historically, or artistically significant". To mark the 50th anniversary of the song, McLean is scheduled to perform a 35-date tour through Europe, starting in Wales and ending in Austria, in 2022.

Background
Don McLean reportedly wrote "American Pie" in Saratoga Springs, New York, at Caffè Lena, but a 2011 New York Times article quotes McLean as disputing this claim. Some employees at Caffè Lena claim that he started writing the song there, and then continued to write the song in both Cold Spring, New York, and Philadelphia, Pennsylvania. McLean claims that the song was only written in Cold Spring and Philadelphia. Tin & Lint, a bar on Caroline Street in Saratoga Springs, claims the song was written there, and a plaque marks the table. While some have claimed other places, such as Saint Joseph's University, as where the song was first performed, McLean insists that the song made its debut in Philadelphia at Temple University when he opened for Laura Nyro on March 14, 1971. However a 2022 documentary on the history of the song notes that particular concert actually occurred at the nearby Saint Joseph's University.

The song was produced by Ed Freeman and recorded with a few session musicians. Freeman did not want McLean to play rhythm guitar on the song but eventually relented. McLean and the session musicians rehearsed for two weeks but failed to get the song right. At the last minute, the pianist Paul Griffin was added, which is when the tune came together. McLean used a 1969 or 1970 Martin D-28 guitar to provide the basic chords throughout "American Pie". 

The song debuted in the album American Pie in October 1971, and was released as a single in December. The song's eight-and-a-half-minute length meant that it could not fit entirely on one side of the 45 RPM record, so United Artists had the first  taking up the A-side of the record and the final  the B-side. Radio stations initially played the A-side of the song only, but soon switched to the full album version to satisfy their audiences.

Interpretations

The song has nostalgic themes, stretching from the late 1950s until late 1969 or 1970. Except to acknowledge that he first learned about Buddy Holly's death on February 3, 1959 – McLean was age 13 – when he was folding newspapers for his paper route on the morning of February 4, 1959 (hence the line "February made me shiver/with every paper I'd deliver"), McLean has generally avoided responding to direct questions about the song's lyrics; he has said: "They're beyond analysis. They're poetry." He also stated in an editorial published in 2009, on the 50th anniversary of the crash that killed Buddy Holly, Ritchie Valens, and J. P. "The Big Bopper" Richardson (all of whom are alluded to in the final verse in a comparison with the Christian Holy Trinity), that writing the first verse of the song exorcised his long-running grief over Holly's death and that he considers the song to be "a big song… that summed up the world known as America". McLean dedicated the American Pie album to Holly.

Some commentators have identified the song as outlining the darkening of cultural mood, as over time the cultural vanguard passed from Pete Seeger and Joan Baez (the "King and Queen" of folk music), then from Elvis Presley (known as "the King" of Rock and Roll), to Bob Dylan ("the Jester") – who wore a jacket similar to that worn by cultural icon James Dean, was known as "the voice of his generation" ("a voice that came from you and me"), and whose motorcycle accident ("in a cast") left him in reclusion for many years, recording in studios rather than touring ("on the sidelines"), to The Beatles (John Lennon, punned with Lenin, and "the Quartet" – although McLean has stated the Quartet is a reference to other people), to The Byrds (who wrote one of the first psychedelic rock songs, "Eight Miles High", and then "fell fast" – the song was banned and one of the group entered rehabilitation, known colloquially as a "fallout shelter"), and shortly after, the group declined as it lost members, changed genres, and alienated fans), to The Rolling Stones (who released Jumpin' Jack Flash and Their Satanic Majesties Request ("Jack Flash", "Satan", "The Devil"), and used Hells Angels – "Angels born in Hell" – as event security, with fatal consequences, bringing the 1960s to a violent end), and to Janis Joplin (the "girl who sang the blues" but just "turned away" – she died of a heroin overdose the following year).

It has also been speculated that the song contains numerous references to post-World War II American political events, such as the assassination of John F. Kennedy (known casually as "Jack") and subsequent killing of his assassin (whose courtroom trial obviously ended as a result ("adjourned")), the Cuban Missile Crisis ("Jack be nimble, Jack be quick"), the murders of civil rights workers James Chaney, Andrew Goodman, and Michael Schwerner, and elements of culture such as sock hops ("kicking off shoes" to dance, preventing damage to the varnished floor), cruising with a pickup truck, the rise of the political protest song ("a voice that came from you and me"), drugs and the counterculture, the Manson Family and the Tate–LaBianca murders in the "summer swelter" of 1969 (the Beatles' song "Helter Skelter") and much more.

Many additional and alternative interpretations have also been proposed.

For example, Bob Dylan's first performance in Great Britain was also at a pub called "The King and Queen", and he also appeared more literally "on the sidelines in a (the) cast" – as one of many stars at the back far right of the cover art of the Beatles' album Sgt. Pepper's Lonely Hearts Club Band ("the Sergeants played a marching tune").

The song title itself is a reference to apple pie, an unofficial symbol of the United States and one of its signature comfort foods, as seen in the popular expression "As American as apple pie". By the twentieth century, this had become a symbol of American prosperity and national pride.

The original United Artists Records inner sleeve featured a free verse poem written by McLean about William Boyd, also known as Hopalong Cassidy, along with a picture of Boyd in full Hopalong regalia. Its inclusion in the album was interpreted to represent a sense of loss of a type of American culture as symbolized by Hopalong Cassidy and by black and white television as a whole.

Mike Mills of R.E.M. reflected: "'American Pie' just made perfect sense to me as a song and that's what impressed me the most. I could say to people this is how to write songs. When you've written at least three songs that can be considered classic that is a very high batting average and if one of those songs happens to be something that a great many people think is one of the greatest songs ever written you've not only hit the top of the mountain but you've stayed high on the mountain for a long time."

McLean reveals the meaning of the lyrics

When asked what "American Pie" meant, McLean jokingly replied, "It means I don't ever have to work again if I don't want to." Later, he stated, "You will find many interpretations of my lyrics but none of them by me…  Sorry to leave you all on your own like this but long ago I realized that songwriters should make their statements and move on, maintaining a dignified silence." He also commented on the popularity of his music, "I didn't write songs that were just catchy, but with a point of view, or songs about the environment."

In February 2015, however, McLean announced he would reveal the meaning of the lyrics to the song when the original manuscript went for auction in New York City, in April 2015. The lyrics and notes were auctioned on April 7, 2015, and sold for $1.2 million. In the sale catalogue notes, McLean revealed the meaning in the song's lyrics: "Basically in 'American Pie' things are heading in the wrong direction.  It [life] is becoming less idyllic. I don't know whether you consider that wrong or right but it is a morality song in a sense." The catalogue confirmed that the song climaxes with a description of the death of Meredith Hunter at the Altamont Free Concert, ten years after the plane crash that killed Holly, Valens, and Richardson, and did acknowledge that some of the more well-known symbols in the song were inspired by figures such as Elvis Presley ("the king") and Bob Dylan ("the jester"). In 2017, Bob Dylan was asked about how he was referenced in the song. "A jester? Sure, the jester writes songs like 'Masters of War', 'A Hard Rain's a-Gonna Fall', 'It's Alright, Ma' – some jester. I have to think he's talking about somebody else. Ask him." Dylan's predictions were later confirmed to be true, when McLean denied that Dylan was the jester and Presley the king in the song.

In 2022, the documentary The Day the Music Died: The Story of Don McLean’s American Pie, produced by Spencer Proffer, was released on the Paramount+ video on-demand service. Proffer said that he told McLean: "It's time for you to reveal what 50 years of journalists have wanted to know." McLean stated that he “needed a big song about America", and the first verse and melody seemed to just come to mind: “A long, long, time ago...”.

McLean then answers some of the long standing questions on the song's lyrics, although not all. He reveals that Elvis was not the king referenced in the song, the "girl who sang the blues" was not Janis Joplin, and Bob Dylan was not the jester, although he is open to other interpretations. He says that "marching band" means the military–industrial complex, "sweet perfume" refers to tear gas, and Los Angeles is the "coast" that the Trinity head to ("caught the last train for the coast") – "even God has been corrupted", he comments. He says that "This’ll be the day that I die" originated from the John Wayne film The Searchers (which inspired Buddy Holly's song "That'll Be the Day"), and "Bye Bye Miss American Pie" is a reference to a song by Pete Seeger, "Bye Bye, My Roseanna". McLean had originally intended to use "Miss American apple pie" but "apple" was dropped.

On the whole, McLean stated that the lyrics were meant to be impressionist, and that many of the lyrics, only a portion of which were included in the finished recording, were completely fictional with no basis in real-life events.

Personnel

Musicians 
 Don McLean – vocals, acoustic guitar
 Paul Griffin – piano, clavinet 
 David Spinozza – electric guitar
 Bob Rothstein – bass, backing vocals
 Roy Markowitz – drums, tambourine
 West Forty Fourth Street Rhythm and Noise Choir – chorus

Technical 
 Photography/ artwork  – George Whiteman

Charts

Weekly charts

Year-end charts

All-time charts

Certifications

Parodies, revisions, and uses
In 1999, "Weird Al" Yankovic wrote and recorded a parody of "American Pie". Titled "The Saga Begins", the song recounts the plot of Star Wars: Episode I – The Phantom Menace from Obi-Wan Kenobi’s point of view. While McLean gave permission for the parody, he did not make a cameo appearance in its video, despite popular rumor. McLean himself praised the parody, even admitting to almost singing Yankovic's lyrics during his own live performances because his children played the song so often. An unrelated comedy film franchise by Universal Pictures, who secured the rights to McLean's title, also debuted in 1999.

"American Pie" was the last song to be played on Virgin Radio before it was rebranded as Absolute Radio in 2008. It was also the last song played on BFBS Malta in 1979.

In 2012, the City of Grand Rapids, Michigan, created a lip dub video to "American Pie" in response to a Newsweek article that stated the city was "dying". (Due to licensing issues, the version used in the video was not the original, but rather a later-recorded live version.) The video was hailed as a fantastic performance by many, including film critic Roger Ebert, who said it was "the greatest music video ever made".

On March 21, 2013, Harmonix announced that "American Pie" would be the final downloadable track made available for the Rock Band series of music video games. This was the case until Rock Band 4 was released on October 6, 2015, reviving the series' weekly releases of DLC.

On March 14, 2015, the National Museum of Mathematics announced that one of two winners of its songwriting contest was "American Pi" by mathematics education professor Dr. Lawrence M. Lesser. The contest was in honor of "Pi Day of the Century" because "3/14/15" would be the only day in the 21st-century showing the first five digits of π (pi).

On April 20, 2015, John Mayer covered "American Pie" live on the Late Show with David Letterman, at the request of the show's eponymous host.

On January 29, 2021, McLean released a re-recording of "American Pie" featuring lead vocals by country a cappella group Home Free.

The song was featured in Marvel’s Black Widow movie in 2021. It is the favorite song of the title character, Black Widow (Yelena Belova). The song was sung by Red Guardian later in the film to comfort Yelena.

"American Pie" is also featured in the 2021 Tom Hanks movie Finch.

Madonna version

Background

American singer Madonna released a cover version of the song in February 2000 to promote the soundtrack of her film The Next Best Thing (2000), with the song being serviced to radio on February 2, 2000. Her cover is much shorter than the original (it contains only the beginning of the first verse and all of the second and sixth verses) and was recorded as a dance-pop song. It was co-produced by Madonna and William Orbit and released on the singer's Maverick label, after Rupert Everett (Madonna's co-star in The Next Best Thing) had convinced her to cover the song for the film's soundtrack. Madonna said of her choice to cover the song: "To me, it's a real millennium song. We're going through a big change in terms of the way we view pop culture, because of the Internet. In a way, it's like saying goodbye to music as we knew it - and to pop culture as we knew it." It is included as an international bonus track on her eighth studio album, Music.

"American Pie" was not included in the 2001 greatest hits compilation GHV2 (2001) because Madonna had regretted putting it on  Music. "It was something a certain record company executive twisted my arm into doing, but it didn't belong on the album so now it's being punished... My gut told me not to [put the song on Music], but I did it and then I regretted it so just for that reason it didn't deserve a place on GHV2." she said.

Release and reception
Released on February 28, 2000, the song was a worldwide hit, reaching No. 1 in many countries, including the United Kingdom, Australia, Iceland, Italy, Germany, Switzerland, Austria and Finland. The song was the 19th-best-selling single of 2000 in the UK and the ninth best-selling single of 2000 in Sweden. The single was not released commercially in the United States, but it reached No. 29 on the Billboard Hot 100 due to strong radio airplay.

Chuck Taylor from Billboard, was impressed by the recording and commented, "Applause to Madonna for not pandering to today's temporary trends and for challenging programmers to broaden their playlists. ... In all, a fine preview of the forthcoming soundtrack to The Next Best Thing." Peter Robinson of The Guardian called the cover as "brilliant". Don McLean himself praised the cover, saying it was "a gift from a goddess", and that her version is "mystical and sensual". NME, on the other hand, gave it a negative review, saying that "Killdozer did it first and did it better", that it was "sub-karaoke fluff" and that "it's a blessing she didn't bother recording the whole thing."

In 2017, the Official Charts Company stated the song had sold 400,000 copies in the United Kingdom and was her 16th best selling single to date in the nation.

Music video
The music video, filmed in the southern United States and in London and directed by Philipp Stölzl, depicts a diverse array of ordinary Americans, including scenes showing same-sex couples kissing. Throughout the music video Madonna, who is wearing a tiara on her head, dances and sings in front of a large American flag.

Two official versions of the video were produced, the first of which now appears on Madonna's greatest-hits DVD compilation, Celebration, and was released as the official video worldwide. The second version was issued along with the "Humpty Remix", a more upbeat and dance-friendly version of the song. This video was aired on MTV's dance channel in the United States to promote the film The Next Best Thing, starring Madonna and Rupert Everett; it contains totally different footage and new outtakes of the original and omits the lesbian kiss. Everett, who provides backing vocals in the song, is also featured in the video.

Formats and track listings
Digital single
 "American Pie" – 4:34
 "American Pie" (Richard Humpty Vission Radio Mix) – 4:29
 "American Pie" (Victor Calderone Vocal Club Mix) – 9:07
 "American Pie" (Richard Humpty Vission Visits Madonna) – 5:43
 "American Pie" (Victor Calderone Extended Vocal Club Mix) – 10:36
 "American Pie" (Victor Calderone Vocal Dub Mix) – 6:15
 "American Pie" (Victor Calderone Filter Dub Mix) – 6:06

Credits and personnel
Credits and personnel are adapted from the American Pie single liner notes.
 Madonna – vocals, producer
 William Orbit – producer, guitar, drums and keyboard
 Don McLean – writer
 Mark "Spike" Stent – mixing
 Rupert Everett – backup vocals
 Mark Endert – engineering
 Sean Spuehler – engineering, programming
 Jake Davies – engineering
 Rico Conning – sequencer programming
 Dah Len – photography

Charts

Weekly charts

Year-end charts

Certifications and sales

See also

 Vincent (Don McLean song)
 List of Australian chart achievements and milestones
 List of Romanian Top 100 number ones of the 2000s
 List of best-selling singles by year (Germany)

References

Further reading
  An interpretation of the lyrics based on a supposed interview of McLean by DJ Casey Kasem.  McLean later confirmed the Buddy Holly reference in a letter to Adams but denied ever speaking to Kasem.
  This article correlates McLean's biography with the historic events in the song.  McLean pointed to WCFL (Chicago, Illinois) radio disc jockey Bob Dearborn as the partial basis for most mainstream interpretations of "American Pie".  Dearborn's analysis, mailed to listeners on request, bears the date January 7, 1972.  Roteman's reprinting added photos but replaced the date January 7, 1972, by an audio link bearing the date February 28, 1972, the date Dearborn aired his interpretation on WCFL (http://user.pa.net/~ejjeff/bobpie.ram (Bob Dearborn's American Pie Analysis original broadcast February 28, 1972)).
   Among the potpourri is a copy of the January 7, 1972, Bob Dearborn letter, plus an audio recording, in which he delineates his interpretation of "American Pie".
  Historically oriented interpretation of "American Pie".  The interpretation was specifically noted on in an archived version of McLean's website page on "American Pie".archived version of McLean's website page on "American Pie". The material, dated November 2002, includes a recording of Dinah Shore singing "See The USA In Your Chevrolet" and a photograph of Mick Jagger in costume at the Altamont Free Concert with a Hells Angel member in the background.
 Full "See the USA in Your Chevrolet" lyrics for Dinah Shore on "The Dinah Shore Chevy Show" (1956–1961)
  FAQ maintained by Rich Kulawiec, started in 1992 and essentially completed in 1997.
 "American Pie—A Rock Epic" A multi-media presentation of Rich Kulawiec's The Annotated "American Pie".
 
 

Lyric interpretations and analysis
Many people have analyzed the lyrics since the song was released. Examples of these include:

 Musicoholics: Decoding the Ambiguous Lyrics of Don McLean's American Pie
 American Pie – The analysis and interpretation of Don McLean's song lyrics
 Songfacts: American Pie
 Flashbak: The Day the Music Died: A Closer Look at the Lyrics of “American Pie”
 An Explanation of the Song, American Pie

External links
 The Official Website of Don McLean and American Pie provides the songwriter's own biography, lyrics and clues to the song's meaning.
 

1970s ballads
1971 singles
1971 songs
2000 singles
Billboard Hot 100 number-one singles
Cashbox number-one singles
Cultural depictions of Buddy Holly
Don McLean songs
European Hot 100 Singles number-one singles
Folk ballads
Grammy Hall of Fame Award recipients
Irish Singles Chart number-one singles
Madonna songs
Maverick Records singles
Number-one singles in Australia
Number-one singles in the Czech Republic
Number-one singles in Finland
Number-one singles in Iceland
Number-one singles in Italy
Number-one singles in Germany
Number-one singles in Hungary
Number-one singles in New Zealand
Number-one singles in Romania
Number-one singles in Scotland
Number-one singles in Spain
Number-one singles in Sweden
Number-one singles in Switzerland
Rock ballads
RPM Top Singles number-one singles
Song recordings produced by Madonna
Song recordings produced by William Orbit
Songs about Buddy Holly
Songs about rock music
Songs about nostalgia
Songs based on American history
Songs written by Don McLean
UK Singles Chart number-one singles
United Artists Records singles
United States National Recording Registry recordings
Warner Records singles
Commemoration songs